Desvonde Pierre Botes (born 2 November 1974) is a South African professional golfer.

Botes was born in Pretoria. After winning the South African Amateur Championship in 1991 at the age of 16 years and 5 months, 20 days younger than the record set by Ernie Els, Botes turned professional at the start of 1992. His first professional victory came in the Mercedes Benz Golf Challenge on the Southern Africa Tour in 1993.

Following further successes on the Southern Africa Tour, including the South African Masters in 1998, Botes attempted to qualify for the European Tour. He did not manage to gain full exemption in 1999, but returned the following year and was medalist at the European Tour Qualifying School less than a week after claiming his second Platinum Classic title in South Africa. He finished just outside the top 100 in the Order of Merit, with a best finish of 5th in the Benson & Hedges International Open.

Back problems in 2002 and 2003, meant Botes was unable to retain his place on the European Tour. He returned to South Africa and won the Parmalat Classic on his way to 3rd place on the Sunshine Tour Order of Merit. That promising form prompted another attempt at the European Tour Qualifying School. He claimed the last card for the 2004 season, but made only five cuts in the regular tour events, with a best finish of 9th, and failed to retain his playing privileges for the following season. Since then he has competed on the Sunshine Tour with limited success, although he has won several titles on the less competitive Winter Swing of the schedule.

Professional wins (14)

Sunshine Tour wins (12)

IGT Pro Tour wins (1)

Other wins (1)
1993 Mercedes Benz Golf Challenge

Playoff record
Asian Tour playoff record (0–1)

Results in major championships

Note: Botes only played in The Open Championship.

CUT = missed the half-way cut
"T" = tied

Results in World Golf Championships

"T" = Tied

External links

South African male golfers
Sunshine Tour golfers
European Tour golfers
Sportspeople from Pretoria
People from Madibeng Local Municipality
White South African people
1974 births
Living people